Thranius gibbosus is a species of longhorn beetle native to Sri Lanka and South India.

References 

Cerambycinae
Insects of Sri Lanka
Insects of India
Insects described in 1859